The Al Sharqi family is the ruling royal family of Fujairah, one of the seven emirates that together comprise the United Arab Emirates (UAE).

Founding Fujairah 
The name derives from the singular of Sharqiyin, long the dominant tribe along the East coast of the Trucial States (and the second most numerous in the area around the start of the 19th century), an area known as Shamailiyah. The Sharqiyin were traditionally dependents of Sharjah and, over the centuries, made several attempts to secede and declare independence, finally practically managing this from 1901 onwards and finally gaining British recognition as a Trucial State in 1952.

List of Al Sharqi rulers 

 1879–1936: Hamad bin Abdullah Al Sharqi
 1936–1938: Saif bin Hamad Al Sharqi
 1938–1975: Mohammed bin Hamad Al Sharqi
 1975–present: Hamad bin Mohammed Al Sharqi

References 

Middle Eastern royal families
Tribes of the United Arab Emirates
Arab dynasties
History of the United Arab Emirates